Siddharth Sahib Singh, also known as Siddharth Verma, (born 20 November 1980) is an Indian former cricketer. He played first-class cricket for Delhi, Haryana and Railways between 2002 and 2007. He later worked for the Delhi and District Cricket Association (DDCA).

See also
 List of Delhi cricketers

References

External links
 

1980 births
Living people
Indian cricketers
Delhi cricketers
Haryana cricketers
Railways cricketers
Cricketers from Delhi